The Democratic Rally of the Comorian People (RDPC) was a political party in the Comoros.

History
The party was established in 1968, and was based mainly in Grande Comore. It became known as the "White Party", as it used white ballots during elections.

In the 1970 by-election to the French National Assembly, the RDPC candidate Ali Mroudjaé was defeated by Mohamed Dahalani of the List for the Fifth Republic by a margin of 53–47%. In the cantonal elections in 1972, the RDPC formed an alliance with the Comorian Democratic Union, winning 34 of the 39 seats.

References

Defunct political parties in the Comoros
1968 establishments in the Comoros
Political parties established in 1968